Coeloplana huchonae is a species of benthic comb jelly. It is known from the Red Sea and lives as an episymbiont on the stems of the soft coral Dendronephthya hemprichi. It can be differentiated from its congeneric species by their host, colour, and colour pattern.

References

Tentaculata
Fauna of the Red Sea
Animals described in 2015